Trostyansky is a rural locality (a settlement) and the administrative center of Trostyanskoye Rural Settlement, Novoanninsky District, Volgograd Oblast, Russia. The population was 627 as of 2010. There are 16 streets.

Geography 
Trostyansky is located in forest steppe on the Khopyorsko-Buzulukskaya Plain, 56 km east of Novoanninsky (the district's administrative centre) by road. Udodovsky is the nearest rural locality.

References 

Rural localities in Novoanninsky District